Virginie Dessalle (born 3 July 1981) is a French women's international footballer who plays as a midfielder. She is a member of the France women's national football team. She was part of the team at the 2003 FIFA Women's World Cup.

References

External links
 
 

People from Bourgoin-Jallieu
1981 births
Living people
French women's footballers
France women's international footballers
Place of birth missing (living people)
2003 FIFA Women's World Cup players
Women's association football midfielders
Toulouse FC (women) players
Sportspeople from Isère
Footballers from Auvergne-Rhône-Alpes